Ford Explorer Fuel Cell Prototype is a hydrogen car based on the standard Ford Explorer. The car was introduced at the 2007 Greater Los Angeles Auto Show, which was held in November 2006.

Specifications
Weight 
Seats for 6 passengers
Powered by 60 kW Fuel Cell delivered by Ballard
Two 65 kW Electric motors totaling 130 kW
50 kW hybrid battery
0-60 mph in about 18 seconds
 max speed

Hydrogen storage in the bigger sized center tunnel, replacing the six speed automatic gear

References

Hydrogen cars
Fuel cell vehicles